Alan Marshall is a New Zealand author, scholar, and artist working within the discipline of environmental studies. He is noted as a key scholar in environmental philosophy and for his investigations into eco-friendly cities of the future. For his research on these topics, the University of Wollongong awarded Marshall a doctorate and National Geographic assigned him as an explorer.

Major projects
In 2006, Alan Marshall founded The Ecomimicry Project which tries to meld ecology with Green innovation, sustainable art, and the ethics of environmentalism.

Examples of designs that emerged from this project include:

 a Hemp Sail Battle Cruiser for the Royal Australian Navy (in which a navy ship had its engines 'designed-out' and in their stead it is powered by sails made from eco-friendly hemp)
 a manure-powered swimming pool heating system (in which a luxury pool is heated by the composted body waste of the swimmers)
 a hairy-roofed Carpathian mountain village where the architecture is adorned with an engineered protective material that mimics the fur of local brown bears.

These designs, illustrated by and large by Marshall, were compiled into the Wild Design book and then praised by the Australian art & design media.

In January 2013, Marshall started the Ecotopia 2121 project; which (as noted by CNN and The Independentexplores 'graphic future scenarios' of 100 'super-ecofriendly' cities across the world. In 2015, the master-class part of this project conducted at Mahidol University was awarded the 2015 Kenneth M. Roemer Innovative Course Design Award by the Society for Utopian Studies. Ecotopia 2121, the book of the project written and illustrated by Marshall, has attracted broad critical acclaim. The Times Higher Education review of Ecotopia 2121 stated "very few academics ever produce anything as stunning and imaginative as this", whilst National Geographic UK, Al Jazeera, ZMEScience,  Lithuanian Radio Television, Forbes, and Publishers Weekly variously declared it "curious and creative", "adventurous", "impressive", "visionary",  and "monumental". Ecotopia 2121 was put on Resurgence and Ecologist magazine's Book of the Year list, won a Silver Medal at the 2017 Nautilus Book Awards and placed 1st in the 'Future Forecasts' category of the 2016 Green Book Festival. Many of Marshall's original artworks in the book are on special exhibition at the Bauhaus Museum whilst the 'London 2121' cityscape from the book was chosen by the Museum of London to be displayed within their 2018 London Visions exhibition and by the London Design Biennale as part of their 2021 exhibition at Somerset House. In turn, Marshall's 'San Diego 2121' cityscape was highlighted on the LA7 TV show Piazza Pulita during the pre-COP26 climate talks, whilst the 'Tokyo 2121' cityscape adorned the frontispiece of the book Green Leviathan by Belgian philosopher Mark Coeckelbergh, and the 'Macau 2121' cityscape featured in the pages of the popular Arab women's magazine Sayidaty.

In late 2015, Marshall began a new project in urban ecology called Frankencities which details the worst-case scenarios of emerging environmental problems in a series of cities around the world whilst comparing them to the insights offered by the Frankenstein story. The Daily Express and VICE reported that Marshall's work on Frankenstein extended to critiquing the popular idea that Mary Shelley was inspired to write the original Frankenstein novel because she was affected by a volcanically-induced climate change event known as the Year Without a Summer.

For the Frankencities project and for the Ecotopia 2121 project, Marshall developed a novel urban design methodology known as 'The Literary Method of Urban Design' which is not so much about design but more about inventing new social change strategies. A film scripted by Marshall about this methodology was published by National Geographic Indonesia and became an 'official selection' at a number of film festivals across Asia and Europe.

In 2020, Marshall began the "Global Sheeplands" project which investigates the way sheep have contributed to the making of the modern world. As part of this project, Marshall has made off-screen and on-screen contributions to a two-hour Arte / NDR TV documentary about sheep.

Prior to his 21st century work in the eco-design field, Marshall was mainly involved in eco-philosophy and techno-criticism. In the 1990s, Marshall developed a postmodern version of the Human–Nature relationship, one that throws into doubt the idea that Nature is a united orderly system. Marshall's approach is heavily influenced by the science of ecology but has been criticized as privileging one school of ecology, i.e., ''plant sociology", over others such as systems ecology and the ecology of Gaia -- both of which he critiques as shallow forms of environmentalism. Indeed, his book The Unity of Nature is one of the fiercest critiques of Systems Theory in general, and Gaia Theory and Chaos Theory in particular. 

Marshall is also referred to as a critic of the car industry, of the nuclear industry and of space exploration. His writings on the latter subject have been cited as insightful but are usually regarded by scientists and engineers as being too radically 'environmental' especially his calls for the protection of the Martian landscape.

Fiction
Alan Marshall is also an award-winning writer of fiction; a genre he was very active within from about 1998 to 2002. His works of fiction include an historical novel, Lancewood, about an iconic New Zealand plant, and a science fiction radio drama called This Pointless Thing Called Life that was broadcast on NPR, KFAI, KUNM, and XM Satellite Radio in the USA. In 2001 This Pointless Thing Called Life received the "Silver Award" from the Mark Time Awards by a panel that included Grammy-award winner Phil Proctor who said it was "definitely on a par with Hitchhikers Guide to the Galaxy".

Along with Peter Jackson's The Lord of the Rings movie trilogy, This Pointless Thing Called Life was nominated for a Vogel Award in the category "Best Long Form dramatic science fiction and fantasy production made in New Zealand in the year 2002". Like his scholarly writings, Marshall's fiction explores the relationships between "humans and technology" and between "humans and nature".

The sequel to This Pointless Thing Called Life was another award-winning full-length radio feature broadcast in four parts on XM Satellite and by some NPR stations in 2003. This sequel was titled This Miserable Thing Called Life.

Books
 Alan Marshall (2016) Ecotopia 2121: A Vision of Our Future Green Utopia -- in 100 Cities, Arcade/Skyhorse Publ: NY. 
 Alan Marshall (2009) Wild Design: Ecofriendly Innovations Inspired by Nature, North Atlantic Books: Berkeley. 
 Alan Marshall (2006) Dangerous Dawn: The New Nuclear Age, BNI: Melbourne.
 Alan Marshall (2002) The Unity of Nature, Imperial College Press/World Scientific: London & Singapore 
 Alan Marshall (1999) Lancewood, Indra Publishers: Melbourne.

References

Living people
Year of birth missing (living people)
New Zealand environmentalists
New Zealand science fiction writers
Environmental studies scholars
Neo-Luddites
University of Wollongong alumni